The 1942 Tulsa Golden Hurricane team was an American football team that represented the University of Tulsa in the Missouri Valley Conference (MVC) during the 1942 college football season. In their second year under head coach Henry Frnka, the Golden Hurricane compiled a 10–0 record (5–0 against MVC opponents) in the regular season before losing to Tennessee in the 1943 Sugar Bowl. The team was ranked No. 4 in the final AP Poll. 

Tulsa led the nation in scoring (39.5 points per game) and passing offense (233.9 yards per game) and ranked second in total offense (426.1 yards per game) and eighth in total defense (148.7 yards per game).

Quarterback Glenn Dobbs ranked fourth nationally with 1,427 yards of total offense and eighth nationally with 1,066 passing yards. He was selected as a first-team All-American by the Associated Press, International News Service, Newspaper Enterprise Association, and Newsweek magazine and was later inducted into the College Football Hall of Fame.

Schedule

Rankings

The AP released their first poll on October 12. The Golden Hurricane made their first appearance as a ranked team on October 26.

References

Tulsa
Tulsa Golden Hurricane football seasons
Missouri Valley Conference football champion seasons
Tulsa Golden Hurricane football